ʿAbd al-Raḥīm ibn ʿAbd al-Razzāq ibn Jaʿfar ibn Bashrūn, called al-Ṣiqillī (the Sicilian), was an Arabic poet from Mahdia who spent much of his life in Sicily. He was a court poet of King Roger II (1130–1154) and compiled an anthology of verse, Al-Mukhtār fī al-naẓm wa-l-nathr li-afāḍil ahl al-ʿaṣr (Selected Prose and Verse from the Noblest People of the Age).

The anthology of ʿImād al-Dīn al-Iṣfahānī contains a single qaṣīda from a longer poem by Ibn Bashrūn. In his standard fashion, ʿImād al-Dīn cut it short because it was a panegyric for an infidel. It refers to Roger as "king of the Caesars" or "king of imperial kings" (malik al-mulūk al-qayṣarīya). The passage selected by ʿImād al-Dīn describes a palace, gardens and a menagerie as indicators of Roger's power:

Notes

Bibliography

People from Mahdia
12th-century Arabic poets
12th-century Sicilian people